Maharaja Talkies is 2011 Malayalam film, directed by debutante Devidas Chelanatt, starring Mukesh and  Urvashi in the lead roles.

Synopsis
Maharaja Talkies is about Vimala and her three sisters Ganga, Yamuna and Unnimaya. They run a film theatre that has been bestowed on them by their mother, before she died. Vimala has been more than a father and mother to the younger kids, since their father Raghavan Nair had deserted them when they were quite young. Pappachan who plays the local moneybag, is hell bent on bringing Maharaja Talkies down. He does it by hiring a cabaret dancer, and the people in no time desert the cinema hall and flock around the voluptuous performer. He also seeks the services of a Panchayath president who has been spurned by the 'theatre sisters' and who was asked to buy a few tickets for his family rather that having them for free. Then Venugopal, Vimala's childhood friend, comes to the village as Panchayath secretary. He then helps Vimala save the talkies.

Cast

References

2010s Malayalam-language films
2011 films
2011 directorial debut films